Stedman's Medical Dictionary is a professional medical dictionary developed for medical students, physicians, researchers, and medical language specialists. Entries include medical terms, abbreviations, acronyms, measurements, and more. Pronunciation and word etymology (showing mostly Latin and Greek prefixes and roots) are provided with most definitions. Stedman’s Medical Dictionary and related products are available with a subscription to Stedman's Online.

History
Stedman's Medical Dictionary was first produced as Dunglison’s New Dictionary of Medical Science and Literature in 1833 by Robley Dunglison (1789–1869). Robley Dunglison was a professor of medicine at the University of Virginia. He was the personal physician to presidents Jefferson, Madison, Monroe, and Jackson. In 1903, Thomas Lathrop Stedman became the editor of the medical dictionary and made thorough revisions to the text. The first edition of Stedman’s Medical Dictionary was published in 1911. Additional versions include Stedman's Medical Dictionary for the Health Professions and Nursing, Stedman's Medical Abbreviations, Acronyms & Symbols, Stedman's Pocket Medical Dictionary, and Stedman's Medical Dictionary for the Dental Professions.

Editions
The current edition is the 28th Edition, published in 2005. This edition added over 5,000 new terms and definitions to total to more than 107,000 entries. It succeeds the 27th Edition, which was published in 2000.

Areas of coverage
 Athletic training
 Embryology
 Exercise science
 Health information management
 Massage therapy
 Medical assisting
 Medical transcription
 Occupational therapy
 Nursing
 Pharmacy and pharmacy technology
 Weapons of mass destruction / mass casualty / bioterrorism

References

External links
 Stedman's Medical Dictionaries  at Wolters Kluwer
Stedman's Online

Medical dictionaries